Nightbreaker (also known as Advance to Ground Zero) is a 1989 American historical drama television film directed by Peter Markle and written by T. S. Cook, inspired by the book Atomic Soldiers: American Victims of Nuclear Experiments by Howard L. Rosenberg. The film stars Martin Sheen and Emilio Estevez as older and younger versions of fictional neurologist Alexander Brown. It also stars Lea Thompson, Melinda Dillon, and Joe Pantoliano.

Plot
Dr. Alexander Brown (played by Sheen in framing scenes and Estevez in flashbacks) reflects on his involvement in the exposure of American soldiers to radiation in the proving grounds in Nevada in the 1950s after he is approached by a man who is dying of cancer due to the tests.

Cast
 Martin Sheen as Alexander Brown (1980s)
 Emilio Estevez as Alexander Brown (1950s)
 Joe Pantoliano as Sergeant Jack Russell 
 Lea Thompson as Sally Matthews
 Melinda Dillon as Paula Brown
 Paul Eiding as Roscoe Cummings 
 Geoffrey Blake as Python 
 James Marshall as Barney Immerman

References

External links
 

1989 films
1989 drama films
1989 television films
1980s historical drama films
American films based on actual events
American historical drama films
American drama television films
Drama films based on actual events
Films about nuclear war and weapons
Films based on American novels
Films based on non-fiction books
Films directed by Peter Markle
Films set in the 1950s
Films set in the 1980s
TNT Network original films
1980s American films